The Galleria was a proposed skyscraper and mall during the early 1980s in Lexington, Kentucky bounded by Upper, Main, South Mill and Vine Streets. The primary developer of the 24 level complex was the Webb Cos.; retail was to occupy the lower three levels with offices occupying the remainder. It was never constructed after failing to attract a major department store; the original plans called for two major anchor stores with numerous smaller shops and a fast food court covering two downtown blocks. The state of Kentucky had approved $15 million in economic revenue bonds for both the Galleria and the World Coal Center.

With the cancellation of the Galleria, the Webb Cos. rebranded the effort towards the World Trade Center and the Radisson Plaza completed later during the same decade.

References

See also
 Cityscape of Lexington, Kentucky

Residential buildings in Lexington, Kentucky
Skyscrapers in Lexington, Kentucky
Commercial buildings in Lexington, Kentucky